Eugene Sanders (born November 10, 1956) is a former American football offensive lineman in the National Football League (NFL). He was drafted by the Tampa Bay Buccaneers in the eighth round of the 1979 NFL Draft. He played college football at Texas A&M and Washington.

Sanders retired from pro football due to a shoulder injury. He later worked in management for Xerox and the YMCA, as well as being ordained as a Baptist minister.

References

1956 births
Living people
American football offensive tackles
American football offensive guards
American football defensive tackles
American football defensive ends
Texas A&M Aggies football players
Washington Huskies football players
Tampa Bay Buccaneers players